The UK Singles Chart is one of many music charts compiled by the Official Charts Company that calculates the best-selling singles of the week in the United Kingdom. Before 2004, the chart was only based on the sales of physical singles. This list shows singles that peaked in the Top 10 of the UK Singles Chart during 1993, as well as singles which peaked in 1992 and 1994 but were in the top 10 in 1993. The entry date is when the single appeared in the top 10 for the first time (week ending, as published by the Official Charts Company, which is six days after the chart is announced).

One-hundred and thirty-six singles were in the top ten in 1993. Ten singles from 1992 remained in the top 10 for several weeks at the beginning of the year, while "Twist and Shout" by Chaka Demus & Pliers, "The Perfect Year" by Dina Carroll and "It's Alright" by East 17 were all released in 1993 but did not reach their peak until 1994. "Could It Be Magic" by Take That was the only single from 1992 to reach its peak in 1993. Thirty-one artists scored multiple entries in the top 10 in 1993. Ace of Base, Eternal, Gabrielle, Radiohead and Shaggy were among the many artists who achieved their first UK charting top 10 single in 1993.

The 1992 Christmas number-one, "I Will Always Love You" by Whitney Houston, remained at number-one for the first six weeks of 1993. The first new number-one single of the year was "No Limit" by 2 Unlimited. Overall, fifteen different singles peaked at number-one in 1993, with Take That (3) having the most singles hit that position.

Background

Multiple entries
One-hundred and thirty-six singles charted in the top 10 in 1993, with one-hundred and twenty-four singles reaching their peak this year.

Thirty-one artists scored multiple entries in the top 10 in 1993. Boyband Take That secured the record for the most top ten singles in 1993 with five hit singles. This included three number-one singles: "Pray" in July, "Relight My Fire" in October and "Babe" in December. "Why Can't I Wake Up With You" and "Could It Be Magic?" just missed out on number-one, peaking at numbers 2 and 3 respectively. Fellow Manchester band M People had four top ten entries, with the highest entry, "Moving on Up", reaching number 2. "No Limit" was a number-one single for 2 Unlimited, one of three top 10 singles for the Dutch eurodance group. Chaka Demus & Pliers, Lisa Stansfield, Madonna, Michael Jackson and Whitney Houston all had three top 10 singles in 1993, with Houston's cover of "I Will Always Love You" (from The Bodyguard film soundtrack) spending 10 weeks at number one.

Chart debuts
Forty-three artists achieved their first top 10 single in 1993, either as a lead or featured artist. Of these, seven went on to record another hit single that year: Cappella, Culture Beat, Gabrielle, Haddaway, Niki Haris, Shabba Ranks and Urban Cookie Collective. Chaka Demus & Pliers achieved two more top 10 singles in 1993. M People had three other entries in their breakthrough year.

The following table (collapsed on desktop site) does not include acts who had previously charted as part of a group and secured their first top 10 solo single.

Notes
Slash from the American rock band Guns N' Roses featured on Michael Jackson's number 2 single "Give In to Me", his first hit outside the band.

The Right Said Fred-fronted Comic Relief single "Stick It Out" included a collection of entertainment personalities credited as and Friends. Among them were chart debutants comedians Clive Anderson, Hugh Laurie, Peter Cook and Steve Coogan, radio DJ  Alan Freeman, television presenter Jools Holland, actors Bernard Cribbins, Linda Robson and Pauline Quirke and children's character Basil Brush (voiced by Ivan Owen).

Songs from films
Original songs from various films entered the top 10 throughout the year. These included "I'm Every Woman", "I Have Nothing", "I Will Always Love You" (entered in 1992) and "Someday (I'm Coming Back)" (from The Bodyguard), "Love Song for a Vampire" (Bram Stoker's Dracula), "Can't Help Falling In Love" (Sliver), "Almost Unreal" (Super Mario Bros.), "In All the Right Places" (Indecent Proposal), "Will You Be There" (Free Willy), "Hero" (Hero) and "Again" (Poetic Justice).

Charity singles
The Comic Relief single in 1993, "Stick It Out", was performed by Right Said Fred with the help of a group of entertainment personalities on backing vocals. The single featured Alan Freeman, Basil Brush, Bernard Cribbins, Clive Anderson, Hugh Laurie, Jools Holland, Linda Robson, Pauline Quirke, Peter Cook and Steve Coogan. It peaked at number four on 20 March 1993 (week ending).

Best-selling singles
Meat Loaf had the best-selling single of the year with "I'd Do Anything for Love (But I Won't Do That)", which spent fourteen weeks in the top 10 (including seven weeks at number-one), sold over 761,000 copies and was certified platinum by the BPI. "(I Can't Help) Falling in Love with You" by UB40 came in second place. Ace of Base's "All That She Wants", "No Limit" from 2 Unlimited and "Dreams by Gabrielle made up the top five. Singles by Mr Blobby, Shaggy, Haddaway, Culture Beat and Whitney Houston were also in the top ten best-selling singles of the year.

Top-ten singles
Key

Entries by artist

The following table shows artists who achieved two or more top 10 entries in 1993, including singles that reached their peak in 1992 or 1994. The figures include both main artists and featured artists, while appearances on ensemble charity records are also counted for each artist.

See also
1993 in British music
List of number-one singles from the 1990s (UK)

Notes

 "Twist and Shout" reached its peak of number-one on 8 January 1994 (week ending).
 "Out of Space"/"Ruff in the Jungle Bizness" re-entered the top 10 at number 9 on 9 January 1993 (week ending). 
 "We Are Family" originally peaked at number 8 upon its initial release in 1979. It was also re-released in 1984 but failed to reach the top 10, peaking at number 33. It was re-released in a remix version in 1993.
 "How Can I Love You More?" originally peaked outside the top ten at number 29 upon its initial release in 1991.
 Released as the official single for Comic Relief.
 "Stick It Out" was performed by Right Said Fred, alongside a group of entertainers as Friends including Hugh Laurie, Peter Cook, Alan Freeman, Jools Holland, Steve Coogan, Clive Anderson, Pauline Quirke, Linda Robson, Basil Brush and Bernard Cribbins.
 "Mr Loverman" originally peaked outside the top ten at number 23 upon its initial release in 1992.
 "Young at Heart" originally peaked at number 8 upon its initial release in 1984.
 "Sweat (La La La La Long)" originally peaked outside the top ten at number 43 upon its initial release in 1992.
 "Housecall" originally peaked outside the top ten at number 31 upon its initial release in 1991.
 "I Will Survive" originally peaked at number-one upon its initial release in 1979. It was released as a remix in a similar way to "We Are Family" in 1993.
 The original version of "Living on My Own" peaked outside the top ten at number 50 upon its release in 1985 The 1993 version, which reached number-one, was remixed by No More Brothers.
 "Relax" originally peaked at number-one upon its initial release in 1983. It was one of a number of Frankie Goes to Hollywood songs which were re-issued in 1993.
 "It Must Have Been Love" originally peaked at number 3 upon its initial release in 1990.
 "Hero" re-entered the top 10 at number 9 on 27 November 1993 (week ending).
 "Little Fluffy Clouds" originally peaked outside the top ten at number 87 upon its initial release in 1990.
 "Long Train Runnin'" was first released in 1973 but did not chart in the UK. It was re-released in 1993 with a new remix.
 Mr Blobby was a character from the television variety series Noel's House Party, played by Barry Killerby. The self-titled novelty song became the Christmas number-one single for 1993.
 "I've Got You Under My Skin" was recorded as a duet by Frank Sinatra and Bono from U2, for the album Duets. It was released as a double-A side single alongside "Stay (Faraway, So Close!)", performed by Bono and the rest of U2.
 Frank Sinatra only appeared on "I Got You Under My Skin" on the double-A side, with Bono featuring on both, the other single with his bandmates.
 "Bat Out of Hell" originally peaked outside the top ten at number 15 upon its initial release in 1979.
 "The Power of Love" originally peaked at number-one upon its initial release in 1984. It was one of a number of Frankie Goes to Hollywood songs which were re-issued in 1993.
 Figure includes single that first charted in 1992 but peaked in 1993.
 Figure includes single that peaked in 1994.
 Figure includes single that peaked in 1992.
 Figure includes a top 10 hit with the group Queen.
 Figure includes appearances on Snap!'s "Exterminate!" and "Do You See the Light (Looking For)".
 Figure includes appearance on West End's "The Love I Lost".

References
General

Specific

External links
1993 singles chart archive at the Official Charts Company (click on relevant week)
Official Top 40 best-selling songs of 1993 at the Official Charts Company

United Kingdom
Top 10 singles
1993